Anthimanthaarai is a 1996 Indian Tamil-language historical drama film directed by Bharathiraja. The film stars Vijayakumar and Jayasudha. It is produced by Chandraleela Bharathiraja and Thilaka Ganesh. The film won the National Award for the Best Feature Film in Tamil. The music for the film is scored by A. R. Rahman, marking his third collaboration with Bharathiraja after Kizhakku Cheemayile and Karuthamma.

The film had a brief run lasting for a week in major cinemas and fared poorly at the box office despite its accolades and critical acclaim.

Plot 
An aged man at his retirement (Vijaykumar) pursues a relationship that he could not experience when younger. He was once a freedom fighter and activist, but as time passes by, his efforts become gradually forgotten. Towards the end of his life, he grapples to financially support himself and loses his respect and identity in society. His desires to lead a peaceful retirement with his companion (Jayasudha) is tragically taken away from him by the ungrateful and ignorant community.

Cast 
Vijayakumar
Jayasudha
Sanghavi
Chandrasekhar
Sudhangan
Kottiswar
Veera Raghavan
Kamala Kamesh
Ra. Sankaran

Soundtrack 
The soundtrack of the film was composed by A. R. Rahman and was a promotional audio since the film featured just a few snatches of these songs in the background. It has 4 songs including a Carnatic song written in Sanskrit and 3 instrumental themes. The lyrics were written by Vairamuthu.

Reception 
Kalki wrote . Anthimanthaarai won the National Award for the Best Feature Film in Tamil. According to Vijayakumar, he was a strong contender for the Best Actor award, but lost by a single vote.

References

External links 
 

1990s Tamil-language films
1996 films
Best Tamil Feature Film National Film Award winners
Films directed by Bharathiraja
Films scored by A. R. Rahman